Saint Eulália Church or Igreja de Santa Eulália can mean:

 Saint Eulália Church (Tenões, Braga, Portugal)
 Igreja de Santa Eulália do Mosteiro de Arnoso
 Church of Santa Eulalia de Ujo
 Church of Santa Eulalia de la Lloraza
 Sant'Eulalia dei Catalani

See also 
 Barcelona Cathedral, also known as the Cathedral of Saint Eulália